Mount McArthur may refer to:

 Mount McArthur (Antarctica)
 Mount McArthur (British Columbia)